The Midland Railway 1823 Class was a class of twenty 0-4-4T steam locomotives.  They had the power classification 1P.

History
They were built in two batches of 10 each at Derby in 1889 and 1892.  They were a development of the 1532 Class.  The 1833 Class followed, and confusingly is sometimes grouped into this class.

Under the Midland Railway 1907 renumbering scheme, they were given the numbers 1331–1350. The London, Midland and Scottish Railway numbers were the same.  Seven, numbers 1337/40–42/44/48/50 were inherited by British Railways in 1948.  In March 1948 they were allocated the numbers 58052–58058 to create space in the ex-LMS numbering series for Ivatt Class 2 tank locomotives, but only five received their new number.  All were withdrawn and scrapped.

References 

 
 An Illustrated Review of Midland Locomotives Volume 3 - Tank Engines by R. J. Essery & D. Jenkinson 

1823
0-4-4T locomotives
Railway locomotives introduced in 1889
Standard gauge steam locomotives of Great Britain